The Peace is Our Nation (Serbian and Montenegrin: Mir je naša nacija / Мир је наша нација), initially announced as the Citizens' Bloc (Građanski blok / Грађански блок) is a big tent, moderate and pro-European political coalition in Montenegro, formed for the August 2020 parliamentary election.

History
The coalition was formed on 12 July 2020, and it is composed of the Democrats, DEMOS, the New Left, PUPI, as well some independent candidates, such as liberal politician Vladimir Pavićević, former leader of the Montenegrin party. 

The main goal of the coalition is to overthrow the ruling Democratic Party of Socialists (DPS) of President Milo Đukanović, which has been in power since 1991, announcing an anticorruption, reformist and moderate platform, also representing itself as civic and multinational alternative to the growing populist and nationalist rhetoric within the ruling DPS and opposition Democratic Front (DF), which they accuse of polarizing Montenegrin society and inciting ethnic hatred and unrest. Leader of the Democrats Aleksa Bečić will head the joint electoral list for the parliamentary election in August 2020.

The August 2020 election resulted in a victory for the opposition parties and the fall from power of the ruling DPS, which has ruled the country since the introduction of the multi-party system in 1990. The coalition won 12.54% of the popular vote, which equals 10 seats in the parliament. Coalition list leader Bečić and the leaders of the lists For the Future of Montenegro and United Reform Action, Zdravko Krivokapić and Dritan Abazović, agreed during meeting on several principles on which the future government will rest, including the formation of an expert government, to continue to work on the European Union accession process, fight against corruption, overcoming society polarization, and to work on changing the disputed Law on Religious Communities. They welcomed minority parties of Bosniaks and Albanians, and wished to form government with them.

Electoral performance

Parliamentary election

Members

References

2020 establishments in Montenegro
Political parties established in 2020
Political party alliances in Montenegro
Pro-European political parties in Montenegro